is a Japanese manga written by Fumi Saimon. It was published by Shogakukan in Big Comic Spirits from 1989 to 1990 and collected into 4 tankōbon volumes.

Tokyo Love Story  was adapted into a Japanese television drama in 1991 which aired on Fuji Television in 11 episodes and one special between January and March 1991. The television drama starred Yūji Oda, Honami Suzuki, and Narimi Arimori, and its theme song "Love Story wa Totsuzen ni" by Kazumasa Oda is the 9th best-selling single in Japan.

Plot
Mikami, Kanji, and Satomi have been friends since they were children, having grown up in the same small town in Ehime Prefecture on the island of Shikoku. Now, all three are in their early 20s and have made their way to Tokyo for different reasons. Kanji is last to arrive, having gotten a new job in Heart Sports' sales department and transferring to the Tokyo office. At work, he meets a vivacious new colleague, Rika, as well as being reunited with his best friends from home — Mikami and Satomi. Mikami is Kanji's best male friend and Satomi is their platonic female friend whom both have had a crush on since high school. The situation becomes more complicated as Kanji sees Mikami forcibly kissing Satomi, which upsets Kanji deeply. But he heals his broken heart by developing strong feelings for Rika, who is energetic, funny, encouraging and caring.  However, their relationship is a bit unstable because Kanji is dating her on the rebound, and Rika has been having a (not so) secret affair with her and Kanji's boss, Waga. The affair is de-emphasized in the TV series, but in the manga, the affair is much more important. Rika gets pregnant with Waga's child (not shown in the drama version). Meanwhile, Satomi thinks that Mikami was just playing with her when he kissed her, and so she rejects him. He turns to a medical school classmate, Nagasaki, and begins pursuing her. Eventually Kanji realizes Satomi's feelings, and he chooses her over Rika.

Cast
 Honami Suzuki as Rika Akana
 Yūji Oda as Kanji Nagao
 Narimi Arimori as Satomi Sekiguchi
 Yōsuke Eguchi as Ken'ichi Mikami
 Akiho Sendō as Naoko Nagasaki
 Tokuma Nishioka as Natsuki Waga
 Kaori Mizushima as Tokiko
 Miki Itō as Ishii
 Hideyuki Nakayama as Watanabe

Production staff
 Producer: 
 Director:  (episodes 1, 2, 5, 7, 9, 11),  (eps. 3, 4, 6, 8, 10)
 Screenwriter:

Episode titles and viewership
20.7%
20.8%
19.9%
17.1%
19.9%
20.1%
22.4%
22.9%
26.3%
29.3%
32.3%
SP:29.9%

Remake
A remake premiered on FOD (Fuji TV on demand) and Amazon Prime Video in 2020.
Cast
Kentarō Itō as Kanji Nagao
Shizuka Ishibashi as Rika Akana
Shō Kiyohara as Ken'ichi Mikami
Anna Ishii as Satomi Sekiguchi
Hidekazu Mashima as Natsuki Waga
Riho Takada
Miyū Teshima

External links
Internet Movie Database entry
Review

1988 manga
1991 Japanese television series debuts
1991 Japanese television series endings
Fuji TV dramas
Japanese drama television series
Japanese television dramas based on manga
Seinen manga
Television shows written by Yûji Sakamoto